Sinwŏn County is a county in South Hwanghae province, North Korea.

Administrative divisions
Sinwŏn county is divided into 1 ŭp (town), 1 rodongjagu (workers' district) and 18 ri (villages):

Transportation
Sinwŏn county is served by the Hwanghae Ch'ŏngnyŏn Line of the Korean State Railway.

References

Counties of South Hwanghae